A H5N1 vaccine is an influenza vaccine intended to provide immunization to influenza A virus subtype H5N1.

Vaccines have been formulated against several of the avian H5N1 influenza varieties. Vaccination of poultry against the H5N1 epizootic is widespread in certain countries. Some vaccines also exist for use in humans, and others are in testing, but none have been made available to civilian populations, however production could be scaled up to quantities sufficient to protect much of the Earth's population in the event of an H5N1 pandemic.

In January 2020, the U.S. Food and Drug Administration (FDA) approved Audenz, an adjuvanted influenza A (H5N1) monovalent vaccine. Audenz is a vaccine indicated for active immunization for the prevention of disease caused by the influenza A virus H5N1 subtype contained in the vaccine. Audenz is approved for use in persons six months of age and older at increased risk of exposure to the influenza A virus H5N1 subtype contained in the vaccine.

Some older, egg-based H5N1 vaccines for humans that have been licensed are:

Sanofi Pasteur's vaccine approved by the United States in April 2007,
GlaxoSmithKline's vaccine Prepandrix approved by the European Union in May 2008, with reactive AS03 (containing squalene) adjuvant.  and
CSL Limited's vaccine Panvax approved by Australia in June 2008.

Other licensed H5N1 vaccines include:
 Adjupanrix, approved for medical use in the European Union in October 2009. Adjupanrix contains the flu strain A/VietNam/1194/2004 NIBRG 14 (H5N1).
 Foclivia, approved for medical use in the European Union in October 2009. Foclivia contains the flu strain A/Vietnam/1194/2004 (H5N1).
 Aflunov, approved for medical use in the European Union in November 2010. Aflunov contains the flu strain A/turkey/Turkey/1/2005 (H5N1)-like strain (NIBRG-23) (clade 2.2.1).
 Pumarix, approved for medical use in the European Union in March 2011.

In November 2013, the U.S. Food and Drug Administration (FDA) approved an experimental H5N1 bird flu vaccine to be held in stockpiles. In a clinical trial including 3,400 adults, 91% of people age 18-64 and 74% of people age 65 or older formed an immune response sufficient to provide protection. Reported adverse effects were generally mild, with pain at the injection site being the most common adverse effect.

H5N1 continually mutates, meaning vaccines based on current samples of avian H5N1 cannot be depended upon to work in the case of a future pandemic of H5N1. While there can be some cross-protection against related flu strains, the best protection would be from a vaccine specifically produced for any future pandemic flu virus strain. Daniel R. Lucey, co-director of the Biohazardous Threats and Emerging Diseases graduate program at Georgetown University, has made this point, "There is no H5N1 pandemic so there can be no pandemic vaccine." However, "pre-pandemic vaccines" have been created; are being refined and tested; and do have some promise both in furthering research and preparedness for the next pandemic. Vaccine manufacturing companies are being encouraged to increase capacity so that if a pandemic vaccine is needed, facilities will be available for rapid production of large amounts of a vaccine specific to a new pandemic strain.

Problems with H5N1 vaccine production include:
lack of overall production capacity
lack of surge production capacity (it is impractical to develop a system that depends on hundreds of millions of 11-day-old specialized eggs on a standby basis)
the pandemic H5N1 might be lethal to chickens

Cell culture (cell-based) manufacturing technology can be applied to influenza vaccines as they are with most viral vaccines and thereby solve the problems associated with creating flu vaccines using chicken eggs.

Vaccine production capacity: The protective immune response generated by influenza vaccines is largely based on viral hemagglutinin (HA) and neuraminidase (NA) antigens in the vaccine. As a consequence, the basis of influenza vaccine manufacturing is growing massive quantities of virus in order to have sufficient amounts of these protein antigens to stimulate immune responses. Influenza vaccines used in the United States and around world are manufactured by growing virus in fertilized hens' eggs, a commercial process that has been in place for decades. To achieve vaccine production targets millions of 11-day-old fertilized eggs must be available every day of production.

In the near term, further expansion of these systems will provide additional capacity for the U.S.-based production of both seasonal and pandemic vaccines, however, the surge capacity that will be needed for a pandemic response cannot be met by egg-based vaccine production alone, as it is impractical to develop a system that depends on hundreds of millions of 11-day-old specialized eggs on a standby basis. In addition, because a pandemic could result from an avian influenza strain that is lethal to chickens, it is impossible to ensure that eggs will be available to produce vaccine when needed.

In contrast, cell culture manufacturing technology can be applied to influenza vaccines as they are with most viral vaccines (e.g., polio vaccine, measles-mumps-rubella vaccine, chickenpox vaccine). In this system, viruses are grown in closed systems such as bioreactors containing large numbers of cells in growth media rather than eggs. The surge capacity afforded by cell-based technology is insensitive to seasons and can be adjusted to vaccine demand, as capacity can be increased or decreased by the number of bioreactors or the volume used within a bioreactor. In addition to supporting basic research on cell-based influenza vaccine development, HHS is currently supporting a number of vaccine manufacturers in the advanced development of cell-based influenza vaccines with the goal of developing U.S.-licensed cell-based influenza vaccines produced in the United States. The US government has purchased from Sanofi Pasteur and Chiron Corporation several million doses of vaccine meant to be used in case of an influenza pandemic of H5N1 avian influenza and is conducting clinical trials with these vaccines. Researchers at the University of Pittsburgh have had success with a genetically engineered vaccine that took only a month to make and completely protected chickens from the highly pathogenic H5N1 virus.

According to the United States Department of Health & Human Services:
In addition to supporting basic research on cell-based influenza vaccine development, HHS is currently supporting a number of vaccine manufacturers in the advanced development of cell-based influenza vaccines with the goal of developing U.S.-licensed cell-based influenza vaccines produced in the United States. 

Dose-sparing technologies. 

Current U.S.-licensed vaccines stimulate an immune response based on the quantity of HA (hemagglutinin) antigen included in the dose. Methods to stimulate a strong immune response using less HA antigen are being studied in H5N1 and H9N2 vaccine trials. These include changing the mode of delivery from intramuscular to intradermal and the addition of immune-enhancing adjuvant to the vaccine formulation. Additionally, HHS is soliciting contract proposals from manufacturers of vaccines, adjuvants, and medical devices for the development and licensure of influenza vaccines that will provide dose-sparing alternative strategies.

Chiron Corporation is now recertified and under contract with the National Institutes of Health to produce 8,000–10,000 investigational doses of Avian Flu (H5N1) vaccine. MedImmune and Aventis Pasteur are under similar contracts. The United States government hopes to obtain enough vaccine in 2006 to treat 4million people. However, it is unclear whether this vaccine would be effective against a hypothetical mutated strain that would be easily transmitted through human populations, and the shelf life of stockpiled doses has yet to be determined.

The New England Journal of Medicine reported on March 30, 2006, on one of dozens of vaccine studies being conducted. The Treanor et al. study was on vaccine produced from the human isolate (A/Vietnam/1203/2004 H5N1) of a virulent clade 1 influenza A (H5N1) virus with the use of a plasmid rescue system, with only the hemagglutinin and neuraminidase genes expressed and administered without adjuvant. "The rest of the genes were derived from an avirulent egg-adapted influenza A/PR/8/34 strain. The hemagglutinin gene was further modified to replace six basic amino acids associated with high pathogenicity in birds at the cleavage site between hemagglutinin 1 and hemagglutinin 2. Immunogenicity was assessed by microneutralization and hemagglutination-inhibition assays with the use of the vaccine virus, although a subgroup of samples were tested with the use of the wild-type influenza A/Vietnam/1203/2004 (H5N1) virus." The results of this study combined with others scheduled to be completed by spring 2007 is hoped will provide a highly immunogenic vaccine that is cross-protective against heterologous influenza strains.

On August 18, 2006. the World Health Organization (WHO) changed the H5N1 strains recommended for candidate vaccines for the first time since 2004. "The WHO's new prototype strains, prepared by reverse genetics, include three new H5N1 subclades. The hemagglutinin sequences of most of the H5N1 avian influenza viruses circulating in the past few years fall into two genetic groups, or clades. Clade 1 includes human and bird isolates from Vietnam, Thailand, and Cambodia and bird isolates from Laos and Malaysia. Clade 2 viruses were first identified in bird isolates from China, Indonesia, Japan, and South Korea before spreading westward to the Middle East, Europe, and Africa. The clade 2 viruses have been primarily responsible for human H5N1 infections that have occurred during late 2005 and 2006, according to WHO. Genetic analysis has identified six subclades of clade 2, three of which have a distinct geographic distribution and have been implicated in human infections:
 Subclade 1, Indonesia
 Subclade 2, Middle East, Europe, and Africa
 Subclade 3, China
On the basis of the three subclades, the WHO is offering companies and other groups that are interested in pandemic vaccine development these three new prototype strains:
 An A/Indonesia/2/2005-like virus
 An A/Bar headed goose/Quinghai/1A/2005-like virus
 An A/Anhui/1/2005-like virus
[...] Until now, researchers have been working on prepandemic vaccines for H5N1 viruses in clade 1. In March, the first clinical trial of a U.S. vaccine for H5N1 showed modest results. In May, French researchers showed somewhat better results in a clinical trial of an H5N1 vaccine that included an adjuvant. Vaccine experts aren't sure if a vaccine effective against known H5N1 viral strains would be effective against future strains. Although the new viruses will now be available for vaccine research, WHO said clinical trials using the clade 1 viruses should continue as an essential step in pandemic preparedness, because the trials yield useful information on priming, cross-reactivity, and cross-protection by vaccine viruses from different clades and subclades."</ref>

, the United States Department of Health and Human Services (HHS) had enough H5N1 pre-pandemic vaccine to treat about 3million people (5.9million full-potency doses) in spite of 0.2million doses used for research and 1.4million doses that have begun to lose potency (from the original 7.5million full-potency doses purchased from Sanofi Pasteur and Chiron Corp.). The expected shelf life of seasonal flu vaccine is about a year so the fact that most of the H5N1 pre-pandemic stockpile is still good after about two years is considered encouraging.

Clinical trials

H5N1 clinical trials are clinical trials concerning H5N1 vaccines. They are intended to discover pharmacological effects and identify any adverse reactions the vaccines may achieve in humans.

References

Further reading

External links
 
 
 

Influenza A virus subtype H5N1